Markos Stefanidis (born 3 April 1967) is a Greek professional football manager and former player.

Coaching Diplomas

Honours

Player
AO Kosmos VP
 Hellenic Futsal Super League:  1998–99
 Hellenic Futsal Super League 2:  2002–03

Manager
Kalamata
 Κύπελλο Ε.Π.Σ. Μεσσηνίας: 2017-18

Episkopi
 Κύπελλο Ε.Π.Σ. Ρεθύμνου:  2018–19

References

1967 births
Living people
Greek football managers
AO Chania F.C. managers
GAS Ialysos 1948 F.C. managers
A.P.S. Zakynthos managers
Kalamata F.C. managers
A.E. Sparta P.A.E. managers
Aittitos Spata F.C. managers
Footballers from Athens
Greek footballers
Greek men's futsal players